Wilfred A Randall (1914 – date of death unknown), was a South African international lawn bowler.

Bowls career
He won a gold medal in the fours at the 1954 British Empire and Commonwealth Games in Vancouver, with Frank Mitchell, George Wilson and John Anderson.

Four years late he won a silver medal in the fours at the 1958 British Empire and Commonwealth Games in Cardiff, with Norman Snowy Walker, Edward Williams and Edward Stuart.

He won the 1951 rinks at the National Championships, bowling for the Kensington Bowls Club.

Personal life
He was an engineer foreman by trade.

References

1914 births
Date of death unknown
Bowls players at the 1954 British Empire and Commonwealth Games
Bowls players at the 1958 British Empire and Commonwealth Games
South African male bowls players
Commonwealth Games gold medallists for South Africa
Commonwealth Games silver medallists for South Africa
Commonwealth Games medallists in lawn bowls
Medallists at the 1954 British Empire and Commonwealth Games
Medallists at the 1958 British Empire and Commonwealth Games